"What Ya Gonna Do" is a single from Hinder's third album All American Nightmare. It was released on May 17, 2011, on Universal Republic Records. The song was written entirely by the band's then current lead singer Austin John Winkler. "What Ya Gonna Do" debuted on the Active Rock Charts at number 19, and eventually peaked at number 18 on the chart.

Music video

The music video starts out with showing the band's heavy drinking while out on the road, throughout the rest of the video is shows the band trying to cope with life on the road after it gets very tiresome. The video ends with the band returning home and returning to normal life and returning to happiness.

2011 songs
Hinder songs
Universal Republic Records singles
Songs written by Cody Hanson
Songs written by the Warren Brothers
Songs written by Austin John Winkler
Song recordings produced by Kevin Churko